William Lazonick (born June 8, 1945) is an economist who studies innovation and competition in the global economy.

Lazonick's research seeks to understand how, on the basis of innovative enterprise, a national economy can achieve stable and equitable economic growth. Lazonick is the originator of "the theory of innovative enterprise", which, he argues, provides both an essential intellectual foundation for understanding economic performance and a fundamental critique of the neoclassical theory of the market economy. Much of his current work focuses on how the financialization of the U.S. industrial corporation, manifested in massive distributions of corporate cash to shareholders and the explosion of stock-based executive pay, results in employment instability and income inequality, while undermining the innovative capability of the U.S. economy.

Lazonick also conducts cross-national comparative research on the social conditions that enable or proscribe innovative enterprise, focusing in particular on the economies of Britain, Japan, and China as well as the United States.

Early life

Lazonick was born in Toronto, Canada on June 8, 1945. Lazonick was an undergraduate in Commerce and Finance at the University of Toronto, receiving a Bachelor of Commerce degree in 1968.  He then attended the London School of Economics, where he was awarded a Master of Science (Economics) degree, with a Mark of Distinction, in 1969. Lazonick spent one year as a graduate student at the Graduate Institute of International Studies in Geneva before entering the PhD program in economics at Harvard University in 1970. For his doctoral thesis, he studied the applicability of Karl Marx's theory of capitalist development to the British Industrial Revolution, the experience that formed the empirical basis for Marx's arguments.

Career

Educational Appointments 

 
In 1975 Lazonick was hired as an assistant professor in the Harvard Economics Department, where he taught comparative economic development, economic history, and the history of economic analysis, all from a perspective that was critical of neoclassical economics. In 1980 he was promoted to associate professor of economics. In 1982-83 he was a visiting professor of economics at the University of Toronto. In 1984-85 Lazonick held the Harvard-Newcomen Fellowship in Business History at Harvard Business School (HBS) and became an initial member of the HBS "Business History Group", working with Alfred D. Chandler, Jr. He remained as a research fellow at HBS in 1985–86 with funding from the German Marshall Fund of the United States and the National Science Foundation.

In 1985 Lazonick was appointed to a tenured professorship of economics at Barnard College of Columbia University. He was also a member of the Graduate Faculty of Columbia University, teaching a PhD course in economic history in the Columbia Economics Department and running a research seminar on national institutions and economic performance with Richard R. Nelson at the Columbia School of International and Public Affairs. In 1989–90, Lazonick was a visiting member in social sciences at the Institute for Advanced Study in Princeton, New Jersey, where Albert Hirschman was the resident economist.  In 1990-91 Lazonick was president of the Business History Conference, the leading association of business historians in the United States. Also in 1991 he received an honorary doctorate from Uppsala University for his work on the theory and history of economic development. In 1992 he was a visiting professor of economics at Harvard University.

In 1993, after the publication of three books in the three previous years,  Lazonick left a tenured position at Barnard University for a tenured position at a regional public institution, University of Massachusetts Lowell.  The lure was the opportunity provided, under the administration of Chancellor William T. Hogan, to build an interdisciplinary graduate program in regional economic and social development at an engineering school that had deep historical roots in local industry and was now in the midst of a leading high-tech district, "Route 128".  Over the next 17 years at UMass Lowell, Lazonick participated in the construction of a world-class Master's program in regional development, run by UMass Lowell's Department of Regional Economic and Social Development (RESD), which he co-founded.

From 1996 to 2007 Lazonick was also on the faculty of INSEAD, the international business school in France, where he held an appointment as distinguished research professor.  Additionally, he was a professor of economics at the University of Tokyo (1996-1997) and a visiting professor at the BI Norwegian Business School (2002-2005).  In recent years, he has also held visiting positions at the University of Bordeaux and the University of Toulouse.

Although RESD no longer exists,  Lazonick remains a professor at UMass Lowell, where he co-directs the Center for Industrial Competitiveness. Lazonick is also visiting professor at the University of Ljubljana, where he teaches a PhD course, The Theory of Innovative Enterprise, and at the Telecom Business School, Paris, where he engages in collaborative work on innovation and competition in the global communication technology industries.

The Academic-Industry Research Network 
In 2010, Lazonick started a 501(c)(3) organization called the Academic-Industry Research Network, also known as AIRnet, which publishes research from Lazonick and other academics. The organization seeks to foster research regarding economic development, and ways it can become more sustainable and inclusive.

Research

Economic innovation 
Lazonick is co-organizer of the Edith Penrose Centenary Conference to be held at SOAS, University of London, on November 14–15, 2014.

Financialization 
Much of Lazonick's research has been devoted to stock buybacks and the alleged financialization of economies. This began during his time at Harvard in the 1980s, where he took note of his colleague Michael C. Jensen, who became a major proponent of mass stock buybacks. Since then, Lazonick has publicly advocated against such buybacks through various research papers and articles, becoming a major voice regarding the matter.

Lazonick began this line of research in the late 1980s, becoming an early critic of the belief that companies should be run to maximize shareholder value. In collaboration with Mary O'Sullivan, he continued this work in the 1990s at STEP Group, a research organization directed by Keith Smith in Oslo, Norway, and in the last half of the 1990s and early 2000s at INSEAD, where he directed the European Commission project Corporate Governance, Innovation, and Economic Performance.

In recent years, this research has made Lazonick a sought-after adviser to various United States politicians. Lazonick advised both Hillary Clinton's 2016 Presidential Campaign, and Bernie Sander's 2016 Presidential Campaign, as well as Marco Rubio.

Impact on innovation 
Lazonick's 2009 book Sustainable Prosperity in the New Economy? Business Organization and High-Tech Employment in the United States, published by the Upjohn Institute for Employment Research, won the 2010 Schumpeter Prize, awarded by the International Joseph A. Schumpeter Society.

References

Canadian economists
1945 births
Living people
Harvard University alumni
Graduate Institute of International and Development Studies alumni